Black Mask Studios is a comic book and graphic novel publishing company formed by Matt Pizzolo, Steve Niles and Brett Gurewitz, designed as a new infrastructure to support comic book creators and a new pipeline for transgressive art.

Black Mask is known for the miniseries Elisa Romboli's Alice In Leatherland, Matthew Rosenberg's 4 Kids Walk Into A Bank, Magdalene Visaggio's Kim & Kim, Matt Miner's Liberator, Tini Howard's The Skeptics, Vita Ayala's The Wilds, Curt Pires's Mayday, Amancay Nahuelpan's Clandestino, Fabian Rangel Jr.'s Space Riders, and Kwanza Osajyefo's White.

Comic book writer Matthew Rosenberg, the writer of Uncanny X-Men and Batman whose first comic book 4 Kids Walk Into A Bank was published by BM, appeared on the Word Balloon podcast with John Siuntres and he said:

"There's going to be a moment in this industry when Matt Pizzolo is really viewed as one of the great eyes for talent.  Up there with, I don't want to say up there with Karen Berger just to not throw myself in with that, but regarding the talent that came out of Black Mask versus other indie publishers: so many good people got their start there.  Tini Howard's first creator owned book is at Black Mask.  Vita Ayala's first creator owned book is at Black Mask.  My first creator owned book is at Black Mask.  Alexis Ziritt.  So many people doing great work.  Like Tony Patrick and Mags Visaggio.  Curt Pires.  Zac Thompson and Lonnie Nadler.  All these people who are doing great, fascinating, cool books.  All these people who are doing stuff that I love can point to Black Mask as that was the first door that was opened.  I think in the history books Black Mask is not going to dominate sales anytime soon, but the eye for talent has been really impeccable."

Host John Siuntres agreed.  "It's a great roster and responsible for a lot of the great new voices in comics."

History
On March 20, 2012, it was announced that Occupy Comics, the charity comic book inspired by and raising funds for Occupy Wall Street, organized by Pizzolo, would not be released through an existing comic book publisher, but through a new company called Black Mask Studios.

Niles and Gurewitz joined with Pizzolo to found Black Mask, Niles noting "if V for Vendetta were created today there would be no publisher for it." Pizzolo has explained that Black Mask will operate under the mottos "to create you must destroy" and "Inspire, never meddle".

On June 12, 2012, Black Mask Studios opened its webstore and officially released Occupy Comics No. 1 with the announcement that Pulitzer Prize-winner Art Spiegelman, Bill Ayers, Ryan Alexander-Tanner, Jimmy Palmiotti, and Matt Bors had joined the book's roster.

On September 17, 2012, the one-year anniversary of Occupy Wall Street, Occupy Comics No. 2 was released to the project's Kickstarter backers and via the Black Mask Studios website. The cover featured a new and iconic illustration by V For Vendetta artist David Lloyd pitting his seminal character V against the Wall Street Charging Bull.

Nearly a year later, on February 14, 2013, Black Mask Studios unveiled its first slate of comics with a two-pronged distribution strategy of supplying comics to traditional comic book shops as well as direct-to-fan through digital-physical hybrid subscriptions.

The following year, in October 2014, Black Mask Studios announced its second slate of 15 new series, a major expansion for the company, flagshipped by Sinatoro from Grant Morrison and Vanesa Del Rey and Disciples from Steve Niles and Christopher Mitten.

Black Mask Studios has since announced several non-comics productions: a TV adaptation of Five Ghosts by Frank Barbiere and Chris Mooneyham, executive produced by Pizzolo and Gurewitz for Syfy and Universal Cable Productions with a pilot by Evan Daugherty; an animated feature film trilogy of Godkiller by Pizzolo, Anna Muckcracker Wieszczyk and Ben Templesmith, a TV adaptation of The Disciples by Niles and Christopher Mitten at Universal Cable Productions, a TV adaptation of Mayday at Imperative, and an adaptation of Sinatoro by Grant Morrison and Vanesa Del Rey at Universal Television with a pilot by Heroes writers Adam Armus and Kay Foster, co-produced with Chris Weitz (Rogue One) and Paul Weitz (Mozart in the Jungle). According to The Hollywood Reporter, Black Mask currently has 11 projects in development at studios.

Warner Bros. Pictures announced that it is developing a feature film universe based on the comic book series BLACK set to be directed by Gerard McMurray (The First Purge, Burning Sands). Sony Pictures Television announced that Black Mask is producing an animated series adaptation of the comic book series Faust set to be written by Matt Pizzolo (Godkiller). Picturestart announced that it is developing a feature film based on the comic book series 4 Kids Walk Into A Bank set to be written by Matthew Robinson (Edge of Tomorrow, Rogue Squadron).

Titles
The first slate of titles was scheduled to launch on May Day 2013 with Occupy Comics No. 1.

The second slate of titles began debuting in late 2014 with new series scheduled to launch through mid-2015.

The third slate of titles (dubbed Black Mask's Class Of 2016) debuted in Spring 2016.

In May 2017, it was announced that Black Mask title Kim & Kim earned the company its first Eisner Award nomination.

Black Mask Studios announced in February 2017 that a new comic Calexit will be released in May 2017, which will be about the Pacific Coast Sister Cities Resistance in a California under martial law by the President of the United States set in an occupied Los Angeles.

References

External links
 Official website
 Official Facebook page
 Official Twitter

Comic book publishing companies of the United States
American companies established in 2012
2012 establishments in California